Akshaibar Lal (born 1 January 1947; also known as Akshaywar Lal Gond) is an Indian politician. He was elected to the Lok Sabha, lower house of the Parliament of India from Bahraich, Uttar Pradesh in the 2019 Indian general election as a member of the Bharatiya Janata Party. He defeated his nearest rival, Shabbir Balmiki of Samajwadi Party by 1,28,752 votes. He was a member of the 17th Uttar Pradesh Legislative Assembly from Balha from 2017 to 2019. Lal served as an MLA for five terms.

Personal life
Lal was born on 1 January 1947 to Bhagwan Das Gond in Barhaj city of Deoria district. He passed 10th standard in 1963 from Shri Krishan Intermediate College, Barhaj Deoria. He married Urmila Devi on 21 June 1966, with whom he has three daughters and a son. He is an agriculturist by profession.

References

1947 births
Living people
India MPs 2019–present
Lok Sabha members from Uttar Pradesh
Bharatiya Janata Party politicians from Uttar Pradesh
People from Deoria district
People from Bahraich